X Factor is a Romanian television music talent show contested by aspiring pop singers drawn from public auditions based on The X Factor series. It is broadcast on the Antena 1 channel in Romania.

The competition is open to both solo artists and groups and has no upper age limit. Each judge is assigned one of three categories; the criteria for each has varied between seasons. Throughout the live shows, the judges act as mentors to their category, helping to decide song choices, styling, and staging, while judging contestants from the other categories; they also compete to ensure that their act wins the competition, thus making them the winning judge.

The original judging panel line-up in 2011 consisted of Adrian Sînă, Paula Seling, and Mihai Morar. In May 2012, it was announced that Morar, Sînă, and Seling had all left and would not be returning for the second season. On 15 June, before auditions began, Dan Bittman, Delia Matache and Cheloo were confirmed as the three new judges. When the show was revived in 2014, Bittman and Cheloo were replaced by Horia Brenciu and Ștefan Bănică, Jr.
On July 12, 2016 it was announced that Carla's Dreams will join the jury panel as the fourth judge. Horia Brenciu and Carla's Dreams were replaced in 2020 with Loredana Groza and X Factor Romanian - season 3 winner, Florin Ristei.

Format 
The competition is split into three categories: Solo Singers aged 16–24, Solo Singers aged 25 and over and Vocal Groups. Before the Judges' houses stage each judge gets one category which he will be mentoring.

Stages for season 1-3
There are 5 stages to X Factor competition:

 Stage 1: Pre-auditions (open auditions where producers decide who will perform in front of the judges)
 Stage 2: Auditions (filmed auditions with the judges and a live audience)
 Stage 3: Eliminations (known as 'Bootcamp' in the UK version)
 Stage 4: Judges' houses
 Stage 5: Live shows

Stages for season 4-5
There are 5 stages to the competition:
 Stage 1: Producers' auditions (these auditions decide who will sing in front of the judges)
 Stage 2: Judges' auditions
 Stage 3: Six-chair challenge
 Stage 4: The Duels
 Stage 5: Live shows (finals)

Stages for season 6 onwards
There are 5 stages to the competition:
 Stage 1: Producers' auditions (these auditions decide who will sing in front of the judges)
 Stage 2: Judges' auditions
 Stage 3: Four-chair challenge
 Stage 4: The Duels
 Stage 5: Live shows (finals)

Auditions 

The filming begins at this stage. The acts who got a phone call from the producers after the pre-auditions are invited to take part in the actual auditions with the judges and a live audience. They sing one or two songs and then the judges vote. These who got through will participate in Eliminations.

Eliminations 
Originally known as Bootcamp. Each act who received at least two yeses from the judges during the auditions takes part in the Eliminations stage, which lasts for two days. Here the contestants are allocated to their categories. Each category sings one song and then the judges decides who leaves the competition and who stays in the selection process. Remaining acts have to prepare with a help of the vocal coaches one chosen song that they will perform in front of the panel. Then the judges choose five acts from each category that will get through to the Judges' houses stage. Now both the judges and the contestants find out which judge will be mentoring which category.

Judges' houses 
This stage lasts for two days. The acts visit their mentors' homes. Each judge picks up a guest judge who will help him. Each contestant sings one song. Then the mentor and the person who helps him decide which three acts will take part in the live shows in the studio. 
In season four, these stages of the competition are being replaced by a new stage called "The Six-Chair Challenge", first introduced in the US version of the series. After the Six-chair challenge, each mentor had six contestants for the Duels. The contestants were not told who they were up against until the day of the Duels. Each contestant sang a song of their own choice, back to back, and each duel concluded with the respective mentor eliminating one of the two contestants; the three winners for each mentor advanced to the Live shows.

Wildcard
A new element was added in season 4; mentors were given one "steal", allowing each mentor to select one individual who were eliminated during the Bootcamp by another mentor.

Live shows
The finals consist of two shows: during the first each act performs one, or later in the series twice, and the second show is the results show, where the public vote. The judges mentor a category, where they are responsible for three final acts each.

During the first live broadcast each of the contestants perform one song in front of a studio audience and the judges, usually all the contestants sing live to a backing track. Some performances are accompanied by choreography and instruments. After the song, the judges comment on the performance, and often there is some competition between the judges' views. The lines for voting opens immediately after all the contestants have performed. When there are just 4 or 5 acts left, the format changes a little, with two songs performed by each act. Three acts remain until the grand final where the public vote alone chooses the winner of the season.

Performances
The show is primarily concerned with identifying a potential pop star or star group, and singing talent, appearance, personality, stage presence and dance routines are all important elements of the contestants' performances. In the initial live shows, each act performs once in the first show in front of a studio audience and the judges, usually singing over a pre-recorded backing track. Dancers are also commonly featured. Acts occasionally accompany themselves on guitar or piano.
Each live show has had a different theme; each contestant's song is chosen according to the theme. After each act has performed, the judges comment on their performance. Heated disagreements, usually involving judges defending their contestants against criticism, are a regular feature of the show. Once all the acts have appeared, the phone lines open and the viewing public vote on which act they want to keep. Once the number of contestants has been reduced to five (season 1), or six (season 2), each act would perform twice in the performances show. This continues until only three acts remain. These acts go on to appear in the grand final which decides the overall winner by public vote.

Results
Before the results are announced, the results show occasionally begins with a group performance from the remaining contestants. However, the song is pre-recorded and the contestants mime, due to problems with the number of microphones. The two acts polling the fewest votes are revealed. Both these acts perform again in a "final showdown", and the judges vote on which of the two to send home. They were able to pick new songs to perform in the "final showdown". "Double elimination" took place in some of the results show, where the bottom three acts were revealed and the act with the fewest votes was automatically eliminated, and the two with the next fewest votes performed in the "final showdown" as normal.

Ties are possible as there are four judges voting on which of the two to send home. In the event of a tie the result goes to deadlock, and the act who came last in the public vote is sent home. The actual number of votes cast for each act is not revealed, nor even the order. However, a twist occurred in season two where the rankings of the acts based on the public vote for the week were revealed after the eliminations on the show. Once the number of contestants has been reduced to four, the act which polled the fewest votes is automatically eliminated from the competition (the judges do not have a vote; their only role is to comment on the performances).

In the final episode the three remaining acts sing two songs, including one performed with an invited music star. The viewers choose the winner by SMS voting or phoning. The winner will receive a price of €200,000.

Twists

Season 1

The finals consist of two shows: during the first each act performs one, or later in the series twice, and the second show is the results show, where the public vote. The judges mentor a category, where they are responsible for three final acts each. During the first live broadcast each of the contestants perform one song in front of a studio audience and the judges, usually all the contestants sing live to a backing track. Some performances are accompanied by choreography and instruments. After the song, the judges comment on the performance, and often there is some competition between the judges' views. The lines for voting opens immediately after all the contestants have performed. When there are just 4 or 5 acts left, the format changes a little, with two songs performed by each act. Three acts remain until the grand final where the public vote alone chooses the winner of the series.

Season 2

Owing to the addition of four wildcard contestants, two acts were eliminated from the series' first results show. The three acts with the fewest votes were announced as the bottom three and the act with the fewest public votes was then automatically eliminated. The remaining two acts then performed in the final showdown for the judges' votes.

Season 3

The live shows underwent a change in this season. In the first three live shows, each category will have its own final showdown, the result of which is decided solely by its mentor. The outcome of the fourth show will only rely on the public vote and will have two eliminations (one of which will happen halfway through of the show, when the voting will have been frozen). Thus, the final will have four contestants (not three as in previous seasons). Two of the finalists will be eliminated halfway through the final show, when the voting will have been frozen. The winner is still determined by the public vote.

Season 4

The live shows will have a change in this season. Only four live shows will take place. In the first two live shows, each category will have its own final showdown, the result of which is decided solely by its mentor. The outcome of the third show will only rely on the public vote and will have two eliminations (one of which will happen halfway through of the show, when the voting will have been frozen). The final will have four contestants. Two of the finalists will be eliminated halfway through the final show, when the voting will have been frozen. The winner is still determined by the public vote.

eXtra Factor 

On July 10, 2020, Antena 1 announced that the ninth season will be accompanied by an online behind-the-scenes show called eXtra Factor. The show's presenter was the actress Ilona Brezoianu, known for the role of secretary Flori from the comedy series Mangalița and the episodes were weekly published on YouTube.  The first episode premiered September 11, 2020 on Kaufland Romania's YouTube channel.

Series 2020

Season summary

 Contestant in "Mihai Morar" category
 Contestant in "Adrian Sînă" category
 Contestant in "Paula Seling" category
 Contestant in "Cheloo" category
 Contestant in "Dan Bittman" category
 Contestant in "Delia Matache" category
 Contestant in "Horia Brenciu" category
 Contestant in "Ștefan Bănică Jr" category
 Contestant in "Carla's Dreams" category
 Contestant in "Loredana Groza" category
 Contestant in "Florin Ristei" category

Judges
Judges

The X Factor debuted in 2011 with Romanian recording artist Adrian Sînă, pop singer Paula Seling and radio DJ Mihai Morar as the judges. When it was announced that The X Factor would return in 2012, the jury was entirely changed. In May 2012, it was announced that Morar, Sînă, and Seling had all left and would not be returning for the second season. They were replaced by Holograf singer Dan Bittman, pop singer Delia Matache and rapper Cheloo. In February 2014, rumours began circulating that Cheloo would not be returning for the fourth series, because of his aggressive behavior. When it was announced that The X Factor would return in 2014, Bittman was linked to the role. For the fourth season Bittman and Cheloo were replaced by pop singer Horia Brenciu and rock star Ștefan Bănică, Jr. In July 2016, Carla's Dreams joined the jury, making the jury panel for the first made up of 4 members. In 2020, both Carla's Dreams and Horia Brenciu would be replaced by pop-singer Loredana Groza and former winner Florin Ristei.

Hosts

The show is hosted by Răzvan Simion and Dani Oțil, who are also known for hosting a well known morning show on Antena 1.

Timeline of judges

Legend
 Featured as a judge
 Featured as a winner of the talent show

Judges' categories and their contestants
In each season, each judge is allocated a category to mentor and chooses small number of acts (four or five, depending on the season) to progress to the live finals. This table shows, for each season, which category each judge was allocated and which acts he or she put through to the live finals.

Key: 
–  Winning judge/category. Winners are in bold, eliminated contestants in small font.

Seasons
The auditions for the first season were carried in May 2011. The first series of the show aired starting 17 September 2011.
Auditions for producers began in Cluj-Napoca, Romania, on 14 May 2011. They then took place in Constanța, on 21 May in Timișoara on 24 May 2011, on 4 June in Iași and concluded on 11 June 2011 in Bucharest. The first season ended on 1 January 2012, Andrei Leonte (16-24s) mentored by Mihai Morar was declared the first winner of The X Factor in Romania. Alin Văduva (Over 25s) was runner-up followed by Iulian Vasile (Over 25s) in third place. Leonte won by 51.0% of the votes.

The second season of the show aired starting 23 September 2012. Auditions for producers began in Craiova, România, on 15 June 2012. They then took place in Sibiu, on 18 June in Timișoara on 21 June 2012, on 27 June in Iași and concluded on 1 July 2012 in Bucharest. In the second season the judges are Dan Bittman, Delia Matache and Cheloo. The second season ended on 23 December 2012, Tudor Turcu (Over 25s) mentored by Cheloo was declared 
the second winner of The X Factor in Romania. Ioana Anuța (16-24s) was runner-up followed by Natalia Selegean (Over 25s) in third place.

The third season of the show aired starting on 22 September 2013. This season has the slogan "Muzică și suflet" (literally "Music and soul"). Auditions for producers began in Craiova, România, on 2 June. They then took place in Arad, on 5 June in Cluj Napoca on 8 June 2013, on 11 June in Iași, on 14 June in Constanța and concluded on 17 June 2013 in Bucharest. All three judges are returning for season 3. On December 22, 2013, the season was won by Florin Ristei, mentored by Matache. Alex Mațaev, mentored also by Matache finished in second place and in third place was Mădălina Lefter, mentored by Dan Bittman.

The fourth season of the show aired starting on 19 September 2014. The first auditions took place at Craiova, on 24 May.  They then took place in Sibiu, on 26 May, in Arad, on May 28 in Cluj Napoca on May 30, 2014, on June 2 in Iași, on June 5 in Galați and concluded on June 7, 2013 in Bucharest. Singer Delia Matache returned to the judging panel, while Horia Brenciu and Ștefan Bănică, Jr. joined the panel as replacements for the departing judges.

Reception

Television ratings
Seasonal rankings (based on average total viewers per episode) of X Factor on Antena 1.

Awards and nominations

References

External links
 X Factor Romania Official website

 
Romanian music
Television series by Fremantle (company)
2011 Romanian television series debuts
Antena 1 (Romania) original programming
Romanian television series based on British television series
Romanian television series